= Sereana =

Town of ancient Phrygia

Coordinates: 39°32′04″N 30°33′52″E

Sereana was a town of ancient Phrygia, inhabited during Roman times. Its name does not occur in ancient authors, but is inferred from epigraphic and other evidence.

Its site is tentatively located near Kuyucak in Asiatic Turkey.
